Wills Hill, 1st Marquess of Downshire,  (30 May 1718 – 7 October 1793), known as The 2nd Viscount Hillsborough from 1742 to 1751 and as The 1st Earl of Hillsborough from 1751 to 1789, was a British politician of the Georgian era.

Best known in North America as the Earl of Hillsborough, he served as Secretary of State for the Colonies from 1768 to 1772, a critical period leading toward the American War of Independence.

Background
Born in Fairford, Gloucestershire, Wills Hill was the son of Trevor Hill, 1st Viscount Hillsborough, and Mary, daughter of Anthony Rowe. He was named after General Sir Charles Wills, his godfather.

Political career
Hill, known retrospectively as Downshire, was returned to Parliament for Warwick in 1741, a seat he held until 1756. He succeeded his father as The 2nd Viscount Hillsborough in May 1742 (as this was an Irish peerage he was able to continue to sit in the British House of Commons). Lord Hillsborough, as he now was, was the same year appointed Lord Lieutenant of County Down and Custos Rotulorum of County Down.

In 1751, he was created Earl of Hillsborough in the Peerage of Ireland. In 1754, he was made Comptroller of the Household, a post he held until 1756, and appointed a Privy Counsellor. In 1756, he was created Baron Harwich, of Harwich in the County of Essex, in the Peerage of Great Britain, which entitled him to a seat in the House of Lords.

For nearly two years, between 1763 and 1765, Lord Hillsborough was President of the Board of Trade and Plantations under George Grenville, and after a brief period of retirement he filled the same position in 1766, and then that of joint Postmaster General, under the Earl of Chatham. From 1768 to 1772, Hillsborough was Secretary of State for the Colonies and also President of the Board of Trade. Both in and out of office, Hillsborough opposed all concessions to the American colonists, but he favoured the project for a union between England and the Kingdom of Ireland. On his retirement in 1772, he was created Earl of Hillsborough in the Peerage of Great Britain.

In 1779 he served as Secretary of State for the Southern Department, remaining until 1782. He was the last person to serve in this position, because the Secretaries of State were reorganized.

In 1789, he was made Marquess of Downshire in the Irish peerage.

Family and legacy

Lord Downshire married firstly Lady Margaretta, daughter of The 19th Earl of Kildare, in 1747. His second daughter and last child by his first marriage was Lady Charlotte Hill, wife of The 1st Earl Talbot. Lady Talbot was the subject of a notable portrait by Sir Joshua Reynolds. 

After her death in 1766, he married secondly Mary Bilson-Legge, 1st Baroness Stawell, daughter of Edward, 4th Baron Stawell, and widow of Henry Bilson-Legge, in 1768. She died in 1780. 

Lord Downshire died on 7 October 1793, aged 75, and was succeeded by his son from his first marriage, Arthur. 

In the United States, Hillsborough County, New Hampshire, Hillsborough Township, New Jersey, the town of Hillsborough, New Hampshire, within the county, the town of Hillsborough, North Carolina, and Hillsborough County, Florida, were named after the Marquess. Hillsborough, California, named for Hillsborough, New Hampshire, is an indirect namesake.

In Canada,  Hillsborough Bay, on Prince Edward Island, and the village of Hillsborough, New Brunswick, were named in Downshire's honour.

References

Bibliography
 Murdoch, Tessa, ed. Great Irish Households: Inventories from the Long Eighteenth Century. Cambridge: John Adamson, 2022  . See pp. 125–8 and 137–45 for transcripts of the inventories of Wills Hill's house at Hillsborough in 1746 and of his later house, Hillsborough Lodge, in 1777.

External links

1718 births
1793 deaths
Secretaries of State for the Colonies
Members of the Privy Council of Great Britain
Members of the Privy Council of Ireland
Members of the Parliament of Great Britain for English constituencies
British MPs 1741–1747
British MPs 1747–1754
British MPs 1754–1761
Peers of Great Britain created by George II
Fellows of the Royal Society
United Kingdom Postmasters General
Wills
18th-century Irish landowners
Lord-Lieutenants of Down
Wills
People from Fairford
Presidents of the Board of Trade